Synaptonemal complex protein 1 is a protein involved in the synaptonemal complex during meiosis, that in humans is encoded by the SYCP1 gene.

References

Further reading

External links